Coalmont is an unincorporated community and U.S. Post Office in Jackson County, Colorado, United States.
The town is named for the open-pit  lignite coal mines in the area, from which coal was shipped out on the Union Pacific Railroad to the mainline at Laramie, Wyoming.



Geography
Coalmont is located at  (40.562069,-106.445675).

See also

References

External links

Unincorporated communities in Jackson County, Colorado
Unincorporated communities in Colorado